Tadeusz Krwawicz (15 January 1910 – 17 August 1988) was a Polish ophthalmologist. He pioneered the use of cryosurgery in ophthalmology.
He was the first to describe a method of cataract extraction by cryoadhesion in 1961, and to develop a probe by means of which cataracts can be grasped and extracted.

The Tadeusz Krwawicz Gold Medal is awarded by the International Council of Ophthalmology Board every four years.

References

External links
 A. Wróbel. Tadeusz Krwawicz (1910-1988). PAN Lublin. 

1910 births
1988 deaths
Physicians from Lviv
People from the Kingdom of Galicia and Lodomeria
Polish inventors
Polish ophthalmologists
20th-century Polish physicians
Recipients of the State Award Badge (Poland)